Adam Hughes (born 14 July 1982) is an Australian footballer.

Club career

UK and Ireland
After the collapse of the National Soccer League (NSL) Hughes had a 2-year spell with English club Doncaster Rovers but never found his feet and left the club in 2006. While with Drogheda United he played and scored against Dynamo Kyiv in the Champions League qualifiers in 2008 .

Return to Australia
On 3 March 2009, he was signed by Adelaide United on a two-year deal. He previously played for Drogheda United, Sligo Rovers (IRE), Doncaster Rovers (ENG), Newcastle Jets, Wollongong Wolves in the Australian National Soccer League.

Perth Glory
On 28 April 2011, he was signed by Perth Glory on a two-year contract.

China
He moved to China, where he signed a contract with China League One club Harbin Yiteng.

A-League career statistics 
(Correct as of 1 June 2018)

Honours
Personal honours:
 League of Ireland F.A.I Team of the Year: 2007
 Wollongong Wolves Player of the Year: 2004/05
 Balgownie Rangers Player of the Year: 2004
 Illawarra Premier League Player of the Year: 2004
 Adelaide United Best Team Man: 2010–11

References

External links
 
 Adelaide United profile
 Oz Football profile
 Drogheda United profile

1982 births
Living people
Australian soccer players
Australian expatriate soccer players
National Soccer League (Australia) players
A-League Men players
Adelaide United FC players
Perth Glory FC players
Doncaster Rovers F.C. players
Drogheda United F.C. players
Sligo Rovers F.C. players
League of Ireland players
Wollongong Wolves FC players
Zhejiang Yiteng F.C. players
Expatriate footballers in China
Australian expatriate sportspeople in China
Chinese Super League players
China League One players
Association football midfielders
People from Lismore, New South Wales
Sportsmen from New South Wales
Soccer players from New South Wales